The 1905 College Football All-Southern Team consists of American football players selected to the College Football All-Southern Teams selected by various organizations for the 1905 Southern Intercollegiate Athletic Association football season. Vanderbilt won the SIAA championship. Virginia Tech, an independent school, lost only to Navy and claims a southern championship for 1905.

Consensus eleven

The All-Southern eleven representing the consensus of newspapers as published in Fuzzy Woodruff's A History of Southern Football 1890-1928 included:
Bob Blake, end for Vanderbilt, unanimous selection, was a lawyer and Rhodes Scholar selected for the Associated Press Southeast Area All-Time football team 1869-1919 era.
Dan Blake, halfback for Vanderbilt, brother of Bob. He later coached.
Honus Craig, halfback for Vanderbilt, Dan McGugin once called him the South's greatest athlete and Vanderbilt's greatest halfback. One report says "When Craig was confronted with the above formidable title yesterday by a reporter whose business it is to know such things, he blushed like a girl and tried to show why Dan McGugin's judgment is not always to be trusted."  In Craig's opinion, Bob Blake was the South's greatest player.
Puss Derrick, guard and captain for Clemson. John de Saulles sums up Derrick's play in 1905; he "is a veteran player who, by steady improvement has put himself in the first rank of linesmen. He was the mainstay of the Clemson season and no other Southern player could so satisfactorily fill this important position; hence, to balance the team and utilize the best of the material available, he is shifted from center to guard."
Ed Hamilton, end for Vanderbilt, coached Vanderbilt basketball in 1903–1904 and 1908–1909
Frank Jones, tackle for Auburn, captain-elect for both football and basketball.
Frank Kyle, quarterback for Vanderbilt, once head coach at Ole Miss.
Owsley Manier, fullback for Vanderbilt, a "great plunging back."
Robert C. Patterson, center for Vanderbilt, known as "Emma," he later coached at Georgia Military Academy and as an assistant for his alma mater in 1908.
Stein Stone, guard for Vanderbilt, as a center selected for the Associated Press Southeast Area All-Time football team 1869-1919 era. 
Hillsman Taylor, tackle for Vanderbilt, later a prominent attorney who was Speaker of the House of Representatives of Tennessee in 1909. He was the father of Pulitzer Prize winning author Peter Matthew Hillsman Taylor.

All-Southerns of 1905

Ends

Bob Blake†, Vanderbilt 
Ed Hamilton, Vanderbilt 
Sam Roberts, Georgia Tech 
Lewis Clark, Georgia Tech 
Wilson, North Carolina 
Thomas Walker Lewis, VPI 
Craig Day, Georgia Tech 
Powell Lykes, Clemson 
C. P. Huggins, Mississippi 
Jones Beene, Tennessee 
Sweat, Georgia Tech

Tackles
Hillsman Taylor, Vanderbilt 
Frank Jones, Auburn 
Lex Stone, Sewanee 
Joe Pritchard, Vanderbilt 
Lob Brown, Georgia Tech 
Pete Willson, VPI 
Bernard Hynes, VPI 
Harvey Sartain, Alabama 
Wimberly, Cumberland

Guards

Puss Derrick, Clemson 
Stein Stone, Vanderbilt 
T. S. Sims, Alabama 
Innis Brown, Vanderbilt 
Lucian Parrish, Texas 
Oliver Gardner, North Carolina 
Frank Stickling, VPI 
Roscoe Word, Tennessee

Centers
Robert C. Patterson, Vanderbilt 
George Watkins, Sewanee 
Red Smith, Cumberland 
Washington Moody, Alabama 
A. L. "Gus" Keasler, Clemson 
Joseph Stiles, VPI 
Sims, Georgia Tech

Quarterbacks
Frank Kyle, Vanderbilt 
John Scarbrough, Sewanee 
Stewart, Cumberland

Halfbacks

Honus Craig†, Vanderbilt 
Dan Blake, Vanderbilt 
Fritz Furtick, Clemson 
Auxford Burks, Alabama 
Hammond Johnson, Virginia 
W. Wilson, Georgia Tech 
Don Robinson, Texas 
Humphrey Foy, Auburn

Fullbacks
Owsley Manier†, Vanderbilt 
LeRoy Abernethy, North Carolina 
Sam Y. Parker, Tennessee 
E. L. Minton, Cumberland

Key

Bold = Consensus selection

† = Unanimous selection

C = consensus of newspapers published in Fuzzy Woodruff's A History of Southern Football 1890-1928.

WRT = selected by W. Reynolds Tichenor of Auburn, published in the Atlanta Journal. He had a first and second team.

H = selected John Heisman. It had a second and third team.

BW = selected by Bradley Walker, celebrated southern official. He had a first and second team.

HY = selected by coach H. C. Hyatt of the University of the South.

AL = selected by coach Jack Leavenworth of the University of Alabama.

NE = selected by a "Nashville Expert."

AJ = An attempt at a composite by the Journal, "players most favored by experts"

JLD = selected by John Longer Desaulles.

WMR = selected by professor W. M. Riggs of Clemson University.

NB = selected by former Tennessee player Nash Buckingham in the Memphis Commercial Appeal. He picked Vanderbilt's whole eleven.

M = selected by a Memphis writer. His first team was Vanderbilt's eleven.

RR = selected by coach R. R. Brown of Washington and Lee University.

See also
1905 College Football All-America Team

References

College Football All-Southern Teams
All-Southern team